Split Images is a 1981 crime novel written by Elmore Leonard.

Plot summary
The novel begins in Detroit and tells the story of Robbie Daniels, a multimillionaire who guns down a Haitian refugee who broke into his Palm Beach mansion, calling it "practice". Walter Kouza, a 21-year veteran of the Detroit Police Department, sees this case as his one chance to quit being a cop and go to work for a big shot. The only one who can stop him is Lieutenant Bryan Hurd, whose unique method of investigation is supported by his good-looking lover and journalist Angela Nolan. The two follow Daniels and Kouza when they travel Florida to find their next victim: a diplomat and drug dealer.

Characters in Split Images
Robbie Daniels – multimillionaire and playboy killer
Walter Kouza – ex-cop and Robbie's bodyguard
Louverture Damien – Haitian burglar and 1st victim
Curtis Moore – parking attendant and 2nd victim
Chichi – drug dealer
Bryan Hurd – Detroit homicide lieutenant
Gary Hammond – Palm Beach squad-car officer
Annie Maguire – Detroit homicide detective
Angela Nolan – journalist and Bryan's girlfriend

External links
Split Images at Elmore Leonard.com

1981 American novels
Novels by Elmore Leonard
Novels set in Detroit
Novels set in Florida
Arbor House books